The Buru bush warbler (Locustella disturbans) is a species of Old World warbler in the family Locustellidae. It is endemic to the island Buru in Indonesia where it is found on the forest floor.

References

 

Buru bush warbler
Birds of Buru
Buru bush warbler
Buru bush warbler